Daniel 'Dani' Pedrosa Loureiro (born 4 September 1996) is a Spanish footballer who plays for Racing Club Vilalbés as a forward.

Club career
Born in Ribadeo, Lugo, Pedrosa was a youth product of CD Lugo. He was an instrumental part of the side while playing with the Juvenil squad.

Pedrosa made his official debut for the Galicians' main squad on 16 October 2013, replacing fellow youth graduate Keko Vilariño in a 0–1 away loss against Recreativo de Huelva for the season's Copa del Rey. He made his Segunda División debut on 31 May 2015, starting in a 1–1 home draw against Albacete Balompié.

On 27 January 2016, Pedrosa and his Lugo teammate Keko Vilariño were loaned to UD Somozas in Segunda División B, until June. On 30 August, their loan was renewed for a year.

On 5 July 2018, after a one-year loan stint at CCD Cerceda, Pedrosa joined fellow third division side Real Valladolid B after his contract with Lugo expired.

References

External links

1996 births
Living people
Spanish footballers
Footballers from Galicia (Spain)
People from A Mariña Oriental
Sportspeople from the Province of Lugo
Association football forwards
Segunda División players
Segunda División B players
Tercera División players
Tercera Federación players
CD Lugo players
UD Somozas players
CCD Cerceda players
Real Valladolid Promesas players